Eroni Sau (born 5 February 1990), nicknamed "The Sledgehammer", is a Fijian rugby union player currently playing for the Provence Rugby in the French Pro D2

Early life and career 
Sau hails from the village of Nabukeru Yasawa and attended Yasawa High School before he moved to Lautoka to finish his Year 13 at Ba Provincial Freebird Institute where he was introduced to play Rugby league, He joined Saru Dragons and was given a contract to play in the Cook Islands.

Later he met Lagilagi Golea (FNRL development officer), who urged him to join a 7s team and contacted Red Rock Rugby Club coach, the late Lote Rasiga. Sau joined the team in Qauai and even toured with the team to Australia.

In 2014 he was recruited as a special constable at Totogo Police Station in Suva and joined the Fiji Police Rugby Team.

Fiji national team
Sau made a name for himself playing local 7's tournaments and was selected by Fiji Drua Head Coach Senirusi Seruvakula to represent Fiji Drua Team at 2017 National Rugby Championship. later he caught the attention of Fiji National Sevens Team Head Coach Gareth Baber and was drafted into the Fiji National Sevens Team. so far he has scored a total of 185 points (37 tries) in 58 matches for his Fiji National Sevens Team.

He was named 2017–18 World Rugby Sevens Series Rookie of the season and also named in the Overall Dream Team of the Season and won the Impact player for 2018 Hong Kong Sevens, and also has won 5 gold and a bronze in  2017–18 World Rugby Sevens Series, He won 2 silver medals for Fiji National Sevens Team, one at 2018 commonwealth games and one as the overall runner up of 2017–18 World Rugby Sevens Series.

On 29 May 2018, Sau signed a two-year deal with French club USA Perpignan.

Statistics

World Rugby Sevens Series

2018 Commonwealth Games

Awards and honours
 2018 Hong Kong Sevens Impact Player of the Tournament 
 5 * Dream Team: 2018 New Zealand Sevens, 2018 Canada Sevens, 2018 Hong Kong Sevens & 2018 Singapore Sevens & Overall 2017–18 World Rugby Sevens Series Dream team of the season.
 5 Gold Medal: 2018 New Zealand Sevens, 2018 Canada Sevens, 2018 Hong Kong Sevens, 2018 Singapore Sevens & 2018 London Sevens
 2 Silver Medal: 2018 Commonwealth Games & 2017–18 World Rugby Sevens Series Runner up
1 Bronze Medal: 2018 Las Vegas Sevens.
 2017–18 World Rugby Sevens Series Rookie of the season (Winner) 
 2017–18 World Rugby Sevens Series DHL Impact Player of the Year (Nominated)

References

External links 
 
 
 National Rugby Championship Profile

1990 births
Living people
Commonwealth Games rugby sevens players of Fiji
Fiji international rugby sevens players
Fijian rugby union players
People from Yasawa
Commonwealth Games medallists in rugby sevens
Commonwealth Games silver medallists for Fiji
Rugby sevens players at the 2018 Commonwealth Games
Fiji international rugby union players
Fijian Drua players
USA Perpignan players
Edinburgh Rugby players
Provence Rugby players
Rugby union wings
Medallists at the 2018 Commonwealth Games